State Route 164 (SR 164) is a north–south state highway in the Cumberland Plateau region of eastern Middle Tennessee. For the majority of its length, it is known as Hanging Limb Highway.

Route description

SR 164 begins in Putnam County in Monterey at an intersection with US 70N/SR 24. It goes northeast as S Chestnut Street past a mix of homes and businesses to have an intersection with SR 62. The highway continues northeast onto N Chestnut Street past more homes and before leaving Monterey and crossing into Overton County. SR 164 goes east through farmland as Hanging Limb Highway before entering mountains and winding its way north to the community of Hanging Limb. It passes through the community before winding its way north to the Crawford community, where it comes to an end at an intersection with SR 85. The entire route of SR 164 is a two-lane highway.

Major intersections

References

164
Transportation in Putnam County, Tennessee
Transportation in Overton County, Tennessee